Munawar Khan is a Pakistani politician and legal advocate who had been a Member of the Provincial Assembly of Khyber Pakhtunkhwa, from 2008 to May 2018 and from August 2018 to January 2023.

Personal life
He is an advocate by profession.

Political career
He ran for the seat of the National Assembly of Pakistan as an independent candidate from Constituency NA-27 (Lakki Marwat) in 2008 Pakistani general election but was unsuccessful. He received 100 votes and lost the seat to Humayun Saifullah Khan. In the same election, he was elected to the Provincial Assembly of the North-West Frontier Province as an independent candidate from Constituency PF-76 (Lakki Marwat-III) in 2008 Pakistani general election. He received 18,871 votes and defeated a candidate of Pakistan Muslim League (N) (PML-N).

He was re-elected to the Provincial Assembly of Khyber Pakhtunkhwa as a candidate of Jamiat Ulema-e Islam (F) from Constituency PK-76 (Lakki Marwat-III) in 2013 Pakistani general election. He received 28,961 votes and defeated a candidate of PML-N.

He was re-elected to Provincial Assembly of Khyber Pakhtunkhwa as a candidate of Muttahida Majlis-e-Amal (MMA) from Constituency PK-91 (Lakki Marwat-I) in 2018 Pakistani general election.

References

Khyber Pakhtunkhwa MPAs 2013–2018
Jamiat Ulema-e-Islam (F) politicians
Khyber Pakhtunkhwa MPAs 2008–2013
Pakistani lawyers
Muttahida Majlis-e-Amal MPAs (Khyber Pakhtunkhwa)
Khyber Pakhtunkhwa MPAs 2018–2023
Living people
Year of birth missing (living people)